BBC Radiophonic Music is the first compilation of music released by the BBC Radiophonic Workshop.  It featured music by three of the Workshop's most prominent composers, John Baker, David Cain, and Delia Derbyshire. The album was originally released by BBC Radio Enterprises in 1968 to coincide with the Workshop's tenth anniversary and later re-released in 1971 on the BBC Records label.

In 2002, the compilation was remastered by Mark Ayres, and re-released with two bonus Derbyshire songs; the original composition "Time to Go" and her version of "Happy Birthday". For the 2003 release of Music from the BBC Radiophonic Workshop, the 2002 remasters of this compilation were combined with Ayres' 2002 remasters of the 1975 compilation The Radiophonic Workshop, and the entire set was resequenced.

The music on BBC Radiophonic Music varied between incidental music and signature tunes, which had been used by various BBC programmes, as well as some radio jingles.  The selection demonstrated many of the methods used by the composers at the Radiophonic Workshop, including musique concrète tape editing and their use of primitive early electronic oscillators.  It featured mostly original compositions, except for Baker's arrangements of the traditional "Boys and Girls" and "The Frogs Wooing", and Derbyshire's version of Johann Sebastian Bach's "Air".

It was reissued on 29 August 2020 as part of the Record Store Day exclusive 6-CD box set Four Albums 1968 - 1978.

Track listing

References

External links
mb21 Discography entry

BBC Radiophonic Workshop albums
1971 compilation albums
Electronic compilation albums
Albums produced by John Baker (Radiophonic musician)
Albums produced by David Cain (composer)
Albums produced by Delia Derbyshire
BBC Records compilation albums